"The Lamb Lies Down on Broadway" is the first song from Genesis's 1974 album of the same name. The song was released as a single in the U.S. Although it did not chart, it was frequently played on American FM radio stations.

The end of the song features the words "They say the neon lights are bright on Broadway. They say there's always magic in the air" from The Drifters' song "On Broadway". The studio recording features a variation on the former lyric ("They say the lights are always bright on Broadway"), but subsequent live recordings feature the original.

The bass-playing on the song by Mike Rutherford has been described as having "connotations of aggressive energy" that fits in well with the concept album's angry and defiant character Rael.

Record World called it "a theatrical rock event with ahaunting plotline."

After Gabriel's departure, the Phil Collins-fronted incarnation of the band performed the song often during their first few tours, usually segueing into the closing section of "The Musical Box". A live version appears on Seconds Out from 1977 as well as part of the "Old Medley" on The Way We Walk, Volume Two: The Longs from 1993. The song was also played in full during the 1998 Calling All Stations tour, with Ray Wilson on vocals. On the 2021 ‘’The Last Domino? Tour’’ they play a laid-back version of the song, closer to the Drifters’s song On Broadway.

Personnel
 Peter Gabriel - lead voice
 Phil Collins - drums, bell-tree, glockenspiel, triangle, wind chimes, tambourine, timbales, backing vocals
 Tony Banks - piano, RMI Electra Piano
 Mike Rutherford - fuzz bass
 Steve Hackett - electric guitars

References

1974 songs
Genesis (band) songs
Songs about New York City
Songs written by Tony Banks (musician)
Songs written by Phil Collins
Songs written by Mike Rutherford
Songs written by Peter Gabriel
Songs written by Steve Hackett